Willard L. Bowman (August 18, 1919 – December 3, 1975) was an American politician.

Bowman was a native of Grand Rapids, Michigan. He served in the United States Navy from 1938 to 1945. Five years later, he moved to Anchorage, Alaska. William A. Egan named Bowman the inaugural director of the Alaska Human Rights Commission 9(F.J.B)0 in 1963. Bowman led the commission until 1970, when he was first elected to the Alaska House of Representatives as a Democrat. Bowman won reelection twice afterwards, in 1972 and 1974. He died of cancer on December 3, 1975, aged 56.

References

1919 births
Politicians from Grand Rapids, Michigan
African-American state legislators in Alaska
Democratic Party members of the Alaska House of Representatives
Deaths from cancer in Alaska
1975 deaths
20th-century American politicians
20th-century African-American politicians
African-American men in politics
United States Navy personnel of World War II